Lauren Kennedy (born September 3, 1973) is an American actress and singer who has performed numerous times on Broadway.  She is now the producing artistic director of Theatre Raleigh in her home state of North Carolina.

Education
Kennedy was born and raised in Raleigh, North Carolina and graduated from Needham Broughton High School in 1991.  She started acting at the North Carolina Theatre while in high school. Kennedy attended the University of Cincinnati College-Conservatory of Music where she pursued a B.F.A. in Musical Theatre. She left school at the age of 19, when she was cast in the 1993 Los Angeles production of Andrew Lloyd Webber's Sunset Boulevard, After a nine-month run, she moved to New York for the musical's 1994 Broadway opening.

Career
Kennedy frequently appeared in the original cast of the short-lived Side Show as the standby for Emily Skinner. She has also starred in Monty Python's Spamalot on Broadway as a replacement for the Lady of the Lake.  She has been seen on Broadway in Les Misérables, Sunset Boulevard with Glenn Close, Side Show, and Cinderella with the New York City Opera.  She originated the role of Cathy in Jason Robert Brown's The Last Five Years in its Chicago premiere, but opted to do South Pacific at the National Theatre in London instead of following the show Off-Broadway (she was replaced by Sherie Rene Scott). In 2004, she starred as Emma Carew in the concert-style version of Jekyll & Hyde – The Musical entitled Resurrection, opposite Kate Shindle and Rob Evan.  However, she left the tour before it concluded, to be replaced by Brandi Burkhardt, who is heard on the recording of the tour.

In 2005, Kennedy starred in the world premiere of Frank Wildhorn & Jack Murphy's Waiting for the Moon, as Zelda Fitzgerald, which took place in Marlton, NJ. She was nominated for a Barrymore Award for Best Leading Actress in a Musical. In 2006, Kennedy played the role of Princess Nefertari in The Ten Commandments: The Musical opposite Val Kilmer.  From 2007 through 2009, Lauren has worked actively with the new Wildhorn / Murphy musical Wonderland: Alice's New Musical Adventure.

She released two solo albums on PS Classics, an album of Jason Robert Brown material entitled Songs of Jason Robert Brown, and an album dedicated to new musical writers, titled Here and Now.

Kennedy starred in the musical Vanities at the Pasadena Playhouse, in California from August to September 2008. She then followed the musical to its Off-Broadway venue Second Stage Theatre.

Lauren is the artistic director of Theatre Raleigh, a theatre company in Raleigh, North Carolina.

She portrayed Diana Goodman, a mother struggling with bipolar disorder, in the North Carolina Theatre's 2015 production of Next to Normal.

Theatre credits

Broadway
 Monty Python's Spamalot – The Lady of the Lake (First Replacement) (2006–2007)
 Les Misérables – Fantine (2002–2003)
 Side Show – Daisy Hilton (Standby for Emily Skinner) (1997)
 Sunset Boulevard – Mary/1st Masseuse, understudy for Betty Schaeffer (under Alice Ripley) (1994–1995)

Off-Broadway
 Good Ol' Girls – Several roles, leading actress (2010)
 Vanities, A New Musical – Mary (2009)

West End
 South Pacific – Ensign Nellie Forbush (2001–02), National Theatre

Regional stage
 9 to 5 – Violet Newstead (2021), North Carolina Theatre
Mamma Mia! – Donna Sheridan (2019), North Carolina Theatre
 Big Fish – Sandra Templeton Bloom (2018), Theatre Raleigh
 The Mystery of Edwin Drood – Miss Alice Nutting/Edwin Drood (2016), Theatre Raleigh
 Next to Normal – Diana Goodman (2015), North Carolina Theatre
 Parade – Lucille Frank (2014), Theatre Raleigh
 Les Misérables – Fantine (2014), North Carolina Theatre
 August: Osage County – Karen Weston (2012), Theatre Raleigh
 Zelda: An American Love Story – Zelda Fitzgerald (2012), The Flat Rock Playhouse, Flat Rock, North Carolina
 Into the Woods – The Witch (2012), Westport Country Playhouse, Westport, Connecticut
 Evita – Eva Perón (2011), North Carolina Theatre
 Violet – Violet Karl (2011), Theatre Raleigh
 Evita – Eva Perón (2011), Casa Mañana, Fort Worth, Texas
 1776 – Martha Jefferson (2009), Paper Mill Playhouse, Millburn, New Jersey
 Annie Get Your Gun – Annie Oakley (2008), North Carolina Theatre
 Lone Star Love – Agnes Ford (2007), Seattle, Washington
 Frank Wildhorn's Waiting for the Moon – Zelda Fitzgerald (Marlton, NJ, Lenape Performing Arts Center) (2005) (World premiere)
 Beauty and the Beast – Belle (2005), North Carolina Theatre
 The Ten Commandments: The Musical – Nefertari (2004), Los Angeles, Kodak Theatre
 Jekyll & Hyde – Emma Carew (Marlton, NJ, Lenape Performing Arts Center, and Mohegan Sun, CT) (2004)
 Breakfast at Tiffany's – Holly Golightly (2004), St. Louis, MUNY)
 The Last Five Years – Cathy (2001), Chicago
 The Rhythm Club – Petra (2000), Washington, D.C.
 White Christmas – Judy Haines, (2000), St. Louis, MUNY
 Hot Shoe Shuffle – Maddy(Theatre Under the Stars, Houston)
 Sunset Boulevard – Mary/1st Masseuse, understudy for Betty Schaeffer (under Judy Kuhn) (1993–1994) (Los Angeles)
 Good News – Corda (1993), Wichita, Kansas

Tour
 Sunset Boulevard – Betty Schaeffer (1995–1997)

Film
 The Ten Commandments: The Musical

Discography
 Good Ol' Girls: Original Off-Broadway Cast Recording
 Vanities, A New Musical: Original Off-Broadway Cast Recording
 Lauren Kennedy: Here and Now (solo album)
 Lauren Kennedy: Songs of Jason Robert Brown (first solo CD)
 The Ten Commandments: The Musical World Premiere at Kodak Theatre, DVD
 Dracula: The Musical: Concept Recording 
 I Sing, the new musical: Original Cast Recording
 South Pacific: 2002 Royal National Theatre Recording
 Side Show: Original Broadway Cast Recording
 Sunset Boulevard: Original Cast Recording
 Good News!
 This Ordinary Thursday, The Music of Georgia Stitt
 Life Upon the Wicked S.T.A.G.E: A Tribute to Jerome Kern
 Paul Simon.

References

External links
 Lauren Kennedy's official website
 
 http://www.theatreraleigh.com/about-us/

1973 births
Actresses from North Carolina
American musical theatre actresses
Living people
University of Cincinnati – College-Conservatory of Music alumni
Musicians from Raleigh, North Carolina
20th-century American actresses
20th-century American singers
21st-century American actresses
21st-century American singers
Needham B. Broughton High School alumni
20th-century American women singers
21st-century American women singers